WDTB may refer to:

 WDTB-LD, a television station (channel 18, virtual 39) licensed to serve Hamburg, New York, United States
 the Warning Decision Training Branch